Larry David Shannon, Jr. (born February 2, 1975 in Gainesville, Florida) is a former American football wide receiver of the National Football League. He was drafted by the Miami Dolphins in the third round of the 1998 NFL Draft. He played college football at East Carolina.

Shannon was also a member of the Oakland Raiders and Jacksonville Jaguars.

He is now an assistant football coach at Venice High School in Venice, Florida.

He is now a teacher at Venice High School. He teaches engineering.

1975 births
Living people
Players of American football from Gainesville, Florida
American football wide receivers
East Carolina Pirates football players
Miami Dolphins players
Oakland Raiders players
Jacksonville Jaguars players